Khoshkabad (also Romanized as Khoshkābād; also known as Khosgābād, Khoshkbād, and Khowshābād) is a village in Garmsir Rural District, in the Central District of Ardestan County, Isfahan Province, Iran. At the 2006 census, its population was 320, in 65 families.

References 

Populated places in Ardestan County